Shelby House may refer to:
(In order of state, then community:)
Shelby Family Houses, Lexington, Kentucky
McClure-Shelby House, Nicholasville, Kentucky
Charles and Letitia Shelby Todd House, Shelbyville, Kentucky, listed on the NRHP in Shelby County
Thomas Shelby House, Lexington, Missouri
Shelby-Nicholson-Schindler House, Perryville, Missouri
Shelby House (Botkins, Ohio)